Sophie Beaudouin-Hubière (born 20 November 1972) is a French politician of La République En Marche! (LREM) who was member of the French National Assembly from 2017 to 2022, representing Haute-Vienne's 1st constituency.

Career
Beaudouin-Hubière worked in HR before running for office. In parliament, Beaudouin-Hubière served on the Committee on Economic Affairs. Since 2020, she has been part of her parliamentary group's leadership under chair Christophe Castaner.

In July 2019, Beaudouin-Hubière voted in favor of the French ratification of the European Union’s Comprehensive Economic and Trade Agreement (CETA) with Canada.

She lost her seat in the second round of the 2022 French legislative election to Damien Maudet from La France Insoumise.

See also
 2017 French legislative election

References

1972 births
Living people
Deputies of the 15th National Assembly of the French Fifth Republic
La République En Marche! politicians
21st-century French women politicians
Place of birth missing (living people)
Women members of the National Assembly (France)

People from Toulouse
Members of Parliament for Haute-Vienne